Lefferts General Hospital was "a 160-bed private hospital" at 460 Lefferts Avenue opened in 1958 in the former Crown Heights Hospital, built in 1928.

The hospital, which closed in 1978, was on a list of 11 hospitals that the State Health Department attempted to close in 1976, allegedly 
"to fill up the municipals." In 1979 the building was converted into a dormitory to house 400 Iranian boys, age 10 to 22,
who came to the United States "after the fall of the Shah."

In 1993 the building was demolished for a girl's yeshiva.

References

Notes

  

Defunct hospitals in Brooklyn